Monrosiella is a genus of leaf beetles in the subfamily Eumolpinae. They are known from South America.

The genus is named in honor of Argentinian entomologist Francisco Monrós.

Species
 Monrosiella freyi Würmli, 1975
 Monrosiella mucronata (Jacoby, 1900)

References

Eumolpinae
Chrysomelidae genera
Beetles of South America